Proiridomyrmex is an extinct genus of ants in the subfamily Dolichoderinae. The genus contains two species; Proiridomyrmex vetulus, described in 2002 where its fossils were discovered in the United States, and Proiridomyrmex rotundatus, described in 2015.

References

†
Hymenoptera of North America
Fossil taxa described in 2002
Fossil ant genera
Kishenehn Formation